Daraban Zam Dam is a proposed dam located in Dera Ismail Khan District, Khyber Pakhtunkhwa, Pakistan. It is proposed to be built on the Khora River.

References

Dams in Pakistan
Hydroelectric power stations in Pakistan
Dera Ismail Khan District
Dams in Khyber Pakhtunkhwa